The Changshu–Jiashan Expressway, commonly referred to as the Changjia Expressway, is an expressway that connects the cities of Changshu, a satellite city of Suzhou, in the province of Jiangsu, China, and Jiashan County, in the province of Zhejiang. The Haiyan hub of the fair, with a total length of 28.45 kilometers, was opened to traffic on the Jiangsu section on 31 December 2016. The expressway is parallel to the Changtai Expressway, which not only can share the flow, but also has an important significance for alleviating the north–south transit traffic in Suzhou. The Zhejiang section was started in 2016 and opened to traffic on 1 January 2020.

References

Chinese national-level expressways
Expressways in Jiangsu
Expressways in Zhejiang